Stillwater Bridge may refer to:

Stillwater Bridge (St. Croix River), a lift bridge joining Stillwater, Minnesota and Houlton, Wisconsin
Stillwater Bridge (Hudson River, New York), a bridge carrying Saratoga-Rensselaer County Roads 125.
Stillwater Bridge (Salmon River, New York), Stillwater, New York, listed on the NRHP in Oswego County, New York